The Shrubbies were an English pop group from Wallington, London, active from 1996 to 1998. Vocalist and guitarist Craig Fortnam, vocalist and bassist Sharron Saddington and former Cardiacs members Sarah Smith (vocals, saxophone, keyboards) and Dominic Luckman (drums) formed the band as Shrubby Veronica. They gigged enthusiastically in London for several years and then split up as Fortnam was disillusioned with playing the traditional indie rock toilet circuit.

Fortnam had a chance meeting with William D. Drake which led to him joining Drake's band Lake of Puppies with Saddington. Fortnam and Saddington fell in love, forming the Shrubbies with Smith and Luckman. The band released an eponymous EP in 1997 and the lone album Memphis in Texas in 1999, following their dissolution. Fortnam later married Saddington and recruited musicians associated with Cardiacs to form the North Sea Radio Orchestra.

History 
After playing bass in a jazz fusion band, Craig Fortnam had a chance meeting with former Cardiacs member William D. Drake, which led to him joining Drake's post-Cardiacs combo Lake of Puppies alongside Sharron Saddington. Fortnam fell in love with Saddington, and the couple formed the Shrubbies alongside former Cardiacs members Sarah Smith and Dominic Luckman. The pop group, initially called Shrubby Veronica, originated from Wallington, London in 1996. They gigged enthusiastically in London and beyond, supporting a headlining gig by Huge Baby and playing concerts with like-minded bands the Monsoon Bassoon, Podsdarapomuk and Delicate AWOL.

 Though the collaboration was creatively rewarding for Fortnam, he became disillusioned with playing the traditional indie rock toilet circuit. Fortnam was annoyed the poor etiquette and atmosphere he encountered at concerts, so the band dissolved in 1998. Following their dissolution, Fortnam married Saddington and recruited like-minded musicians associated with Cardiacs and classical connections to form the North Sea Radio Orchestra, with Sharron on lead vocals.

Shrubbies, featuring Dominic Luckman, were set to specially reform for the Alphabet Business Convention at the Salisbury Arts Centre on 26 August 2017, but were replaced by the band Prescott on the revised bill.

Discography 
The Shrubbies' discography was produced by Cardiacs frontman Tim Smith and released though the record label Merlin Audio. The songs were recorded at Apollo 8 in Chessington, Surrey and Purple Studios in Norwich, Norfolk. The music has been described as folk-pronk and folk prog by Misfit City and  respectively, and their releases have been categorised as acoustic pop, baroque pop, electroacoustic folk, folk baroque, psychedelic folk, psychedelic pop and psychedelic rock. A four-track eponymous EP released in 1997 and the album Memphis in Texas in 1999 following their dissolution.

The Shrubbies EP 

A self-titled EP featuring a selection of songs from Memphis in Texas was released by Merlin Audio on 20 September 1997, exclusively on CD. Misfit City described the tracks as "four complex and leaping songs, swinging through an adventure playground of sophisticated eccentric harmony based around Craig’s dextrous gut-strung acoustic guitars and Sharron’s fluffy chirrup", praising Sarah Smith's saxophone and keyboard riffs.

Track listing

Personnel 
Credits adapted from The Shrubbies EP liner notes.

Shrubbies
Sharron Saddington – vocals, bass guitar
Dominic Luckman – drums
Sarah Smith – vocals, keyboards
Craig Fortnam – vocals, guitar

Additional musicians
Tim Smith – handclaps on "Perfect Present"
Rob Deschamps – French horn on "Carefree Clothes"
Technical
Tim Smith – production
Matthew Cutts – photography
John Whitehouse – digital mastering

Memphis in Texas 

The Shubbies' lone album was released on CD by Merlin Audio in 1999. Memphis in Texas (stylised in all lowercase) was reissued on Bandcamp on 11 September 2011.

Track listing 

 Adapted from Bandcamp.

Personnel 
Adapted from the Memphis in Texas liner notes.

Shrubbies
Sharron Saddington – vocals, bass guitar
Dominic Luckman – drums, percussion
Sarah Smith – vocals, saxophone, keyboard, Hammond organ, cello
Craig Fortnam – vocals, guitars, keyboard, harmonium

Additional musicians
Tim Smith – handclaps on "Perfect Present"
Rob Deschamps – French horn on "Carefree Clothes"
The Inkling Quartet – strings on "Hearty Connection"
Technical
Jonnie Hamilton – photography
Big Faluda Productions (Ian Johnson) – design
Tim Smith – production

Notes

References 

English pop music groups
English indie rock groups
Musical groups established in 1996
Musical groups disestablished in 1998
1996 establishments in England
1998 disestablishments in England